Iceland is participating at the 2018 Summer Youth Olympics in Buenos Aires, Argentina from 6 October to 18 October 2018.

Athletics

Golf

Iceland received a quota of two athletes to compete by the tripartite committee.
Individual

Team

Gymnastics

Artistic
Iceland was given a quota to compete by the tripartite committee.

 Boys' artistic individual all-around - 1 quota

Swimming

References

2018 in Icelandic sport
Nations at the 2018 Summer Youth Olympics
Iceland at the Youth Olympics